The 2014 Hart District Council election took place on 22 May 2014 to elect members of Hart District Council in England. This was on the same day as other local elections, as well as the 2014 European Parliament elections. The election saw new boundaries, the first revision since 2002.

Results Summary 
The table below only tallies the votes of the highest polling candidate for each party within each ward. This is known as the top candidate method and is often used for multi-member plurality elections.

Ward Results

Blackwater and Hawley

Crookham East

Crookham West & Ewshot

Fleet Central

Fleet East

Fleet West

Hartley Witney

Hook

Odiham

Yateley East

Yateley West

References

2014 English local elections
2014
2010s in Hampshire